The 2015 IIHF Challenge Cup of Asia, Division I was the international ice hockey competition played between 18 April and 24 April 2015 in Kuwait City, Kuwait.

Round-round

Participants

Standings

All times local. (UTC+02:00)

References
 http://stats.iihf.com/asia/26/IHM026200_76_11_0.pdf

External links
2015 IIHF Challenge Cup of Asia Division I at iihf.com

IIHF Challenge Cup of Asia Division I
IIHF Challenge Cup of Asia Division I
IIHF Challenge Cups of Asia
April 2015 sports events in Asia
International ice hockey competitions hosted by Kuwait